Parameter names and descri
Omatjenne Dam is a dam in Otjozondjupa Region of Namibia. Located 15 km northwest of Otjiwarongo, it dams the Omatjenne River and was built for the purpose of artificial recharge of ground water. It has a capacity of 5.063 million cubic metres and was completed in 1933, when the country was controlled by South Africa.

References

Dams in Namibia
Dams completed in 1933
Buildings and structures in Otjozondjupa Region
1933 establishments in South West Africa
Otjiwarongo